Taylor School may refer to:

Taylor School (Davenport, Iowa), listed on the National Register of Historic Places in Scott County, Iowa
Taylor School (Bay St. Louis, Mississippi), formerly listed on the National Register of Historic Places in Hancock County, Mississippi.  Destroyed by Hurricane Katrina.